Stoke is a civil parish in the unitary authority of Cheshire East and the ceremonial county of Cheshire, England. The parish is predominantly rural with a total population of around 200, measured with the inclusion of Hurleston at 324 in the 2011 Census. The largest settlement is Barbridge (at ), which lies 3½ miles to the north west of Nantwich. The parish also includes the small settlements of Stoke Bank and Verona. Nearby villages include Aston juxta Mondrum, Burland, Calveley, Haughton, Rease Heath and Wardle.

History
Stoke means "hamlet", from the Anglo-Saxon. It formed part of the ancient Forest of Mondrum. Stoke is not mentioned by name in the Domesday survey; the name was first recorded in 1260. Barbridge is mentioned in John Leland's Itinerary from a visit of 1536. The civil parish was originally a township in the ancient parish of Acton in the Nantwich Hundred; it was served by St Mary's Church, Acton. The manor was given by Randal de Praers to his son, who assumed the name Stoke, and later passed to the Beeston and Aston families. By 1622, it was held by the Minshull family of Stoke Hall. The manor was held by the Wilbraham family from 1753 to 1781, and was then sold to the Craven family.

During the Civil War, Stoke was occupied by royalist forces in December 1643, together with much of the surrounding area. In the 17th–19th centuries, the area appears to have had a substantial Quaker population; a graveyard at Stoke Grange Farm was given to the movement in 1657 and remained in use until the mid-19th century. During World War II, Stoke Manor provided accommodation for land girls.

Barbridge had a watermill on Mill Pool Lane which was used until the 1880s. A smithy was active until the late 1940s. In the mid-19th century, an agricultural business was based in Barbridge which supplied machinery internationally, and a small engineering firm was later based in Stoke.

Governance
Stoke is administered by Stoke and Hurleston Parish Council jointly with the adjacent civil parish of Hurleston. From 1974 the civil parish was served by Crewe and Nantwich Borough Council, which was succeeded on 1 April 2009 by the unitary authority of Cheshire East. Stoke falls in the parliamentary constituency of Eddisbury, which has been represented by Edward Timpson since 2019, after being represented by Stephen O'Brien (1999–2015) and Antoinette Sandbach (2015–19).

Geography, transport and economy

The major land use is agricultural, predominantly dairy farming. The parish includes several small areas of woodland, including The Rookery. The north-eastern part of Hurleston Reservoir falls in Stoke (the majority is in Hurleston), and there is also a small lake in the grounds of Stoke Hall, as well as several unnamed brooks and scattered small meres. The high point of the civil parish, south of Stoke Bank, has an elevation of around 60 metres; the ground slopes gently downwards to the east, with a low point of around 40 metres south of The Rookery.

The Barbridge Junction on the Shropshire Union Canal lies just to the north of the parish; the main line of the canal runs north–south through the parish and the Middlewich Branch runs east–west across it. Hurleston Junction also lies immediately south of the parish in Hurleston. The A51 (Chester Road) runs north–south through the parish; Stokehall Lane connects the A51 at Barbridge with Wettenhall Road via Bremilow's Bridge.

Demography
In 2006, the total population of the civil parish was estimated as 210. The 2001 census recorded a population of 201, in 94 households. The historical population figures were 127 (1801), 143 (1851), 191 (1901), 229 (1951) and 156 (1971).

Landmarks

The grade-II-listed Stoke Hall on Stokehall Lane is a large L-shaped mansion in red brick dating originally from the early 17th century, but with a 19th-century appearance. The hall originally belonged to the Minshull family, who owned the manor of Stoke in the 17th century. A disused dovecote with a bell turret in the grounds of the hall dates from the late 18th century; it is also listed at grade II.

Stoke Manor is a red-brick manor house near Verona, now owned by the County Council and converted into flats. The farmhouse of Verona dates from the 18th century; it was described as haunted in Egerton Leigh's Cheshire Legends of 1867.

The former Barbridge post office (now a private house) on Chester Road dates from the late 17th century. Stoke Cottage on Mill Pool Lane is an L-shaped brick building dating from the early 18th century which was extended in 1856. Both buildings are listed at grade II. Stoke Methodist Chapel in Barbridge was built in 1845. Barbridge has a public house, The Olde Barbridge Inn.

Two canal bridges are listed at grade II. Bremilow's Bridge is a road bridge over the canal main line at Barbridge, which dates from around 1779 and was designed by Thomas Telford.

Education

There are no educational facilities within the civil parish. The parish falls within the catchment areas of Calveley School in Calveley and Tarporley High School in Tarporley.

Notable residents
General James Wolfe, hero of the Battle of Quebec of 1759, is supposed to have spent some of his childhood at Yew Tree House near Verona. Train driver Wallace Oakes, born in Barbridge, was awarded a posthumous George Cross in 1965 for safely stopping a Crewe–Carlisle train which had an engine fire; he died of his injuries a few days after the incident. A locomotive was later named in his honour.

See also

Listed buildings in Stoke, Cheshire East

References

Sources
Latham FA, ed. Acton (The Local History Group; 1995)

External links

Civil parishes in Cheshire
Villages in Cheshire